BTZ may refer to:
BTZ black hole, named after Bañados, Teitelboim and Zanelli
Below the zone, US Air Force program
A defunct cryptocurrency established by Bunz Trading Zone
Better Than Zork, parser used by Synapse Software